Lomen is a village in Vestre Slidre Municipality in Innlandet county, Norway. The historic Lomen Stave Church and the newer Lomen Church are both located in the village. The European route E16 highway runs through the village. The Lomen power plant is located on the west end of the village.

Media gallery

References

Vestre Slidre
Villages in Innlandet